Pothare is a village in the Karmala taluka of Solapur district in Maharashtra state, India.

Demographics
Covering  and comprising 794 households at the time of the 2011 census of India, Pothare had a population of 3882. There were 2031 males and 1851 females, with 477 people being aged six or younger.

References

Villages in Karmala taluka